Feminine Fancy is a studio album by American country music artist Dottie West. It was released in December 1968 and was produced by Chet Atkins. The album was West's tenth studio recording and third to be released in 1968. It was the third album of West's career to not include any singles. Most of the album's 12 tracks were cover versions of country and pop hits of the era.

Background and content
Feminine Fancy was recorded in September 1968 at RCA Studio B, located in Nashville, Tennessee. The sessions were produced by Chet Atkins, West's longtime producer on the RCA Victor label. The project consisted of 12 tracks, most of which were cover versions of country and pop hits by female artists. The album's name was derived from the female recordings that West covered for the project. Country songs covered on the album included "The End of the World" by Skeeter Davis, "Harper Valley PTA" by Jeannie C. Riley and "Tennessee Waltz" by Patti Page. Pop songs covered for the album included "It Must Be Hime" by Vikki Carr, "I'm Sorry" by Brenda Lee and "Broken Hearted Melody" by Sarah Vaughan. One new song composed by West and songwriter Red Lane was also included.

Release and chart performance
Feminine Fancy was originally released in December 1968, becoming West's tenth studio project and third to be issued that year. It was originally issued as a vinyl LP, featuring six songs on each side of the record. It was later reissued to digital and streaming services in April 2018 via Sony Music Entertainment. The album spent three weeks on the Billboard Top Country Albums chart before peaking at number 39 in March 1969. The album did not spawn any known singles, becoming West's third studio record to do so.

Track listing

Original vinyl version

Digital version

Personnel
All credits are adapted from the liner notes of Feminine Fancy.

Musical personnel
 Harold Bradley – guitar
 Buddy Harman – drums
 Grady Martin – guitar
 Bob Moore – bass
 Ferrill Morris – vibes
 The Nashville Edition – background vocals
 Jerry Reed – guitar
 Hargus "Pig" Robbins – piano
 Bill West – steel guitar
 Dottie West – lead vocals

Technical personnel
 Chet Atkins – producer
 Cam Mullins – arrangement, conductor

Chart performance

Release history

References

1968 albums
Albums produced by Chet Atkins
Dottie West albums
RCA Records albums